The Opel K 180 is an automobile which was manufactured by GM Argentina S.A. from 1974 to 1978. It was a variation of General Motors' T-car platform, also used in the Opel Kadett, Chevrolet Chevette and Isuzu Gemini. The K 180 differed from the Kadett in that it had an Argentinian-designed 1.8-litre engine, derived from the locally built Chevrolet 194 engine. Fitted with a downdraught Bendix carburetor and with a 8.2:1 compression ratio, it develops a claimed  SAE at 5200 rpm.

In 1976 the sporting Rally version was added to the lineup, featuring a rev counter, black bumpers, black striping, and other such accoutrements. The next year the more luxurious K 180 LX version was added. The K 180 was awarded Car of the Year in 1977 by APICA, an association of automotive journalists.

It was replaced by the GMC Chevette in 1980, two years after K 180 production had ended.

Related 
Opel Kadett – (Germany)
Vauxhall Chevette / Bedford Chevanne – (United Kingdom)
Holden Gemini – (Australia)
Chevrolet Chevette – (Brazil)
Chevrolet Chevette / Pontiac T1000 / Pontiac Acadian – (United States)
Daewoo Maepsy – (South Korea)
Isuzu Gemini / Buick Opel – (Japan)

References

K-180